Krapets may refer to:

Krapets, Dobrich Province
Krapets, Vratsa Province
Krapets Glacier, glacier on Pefaur Peninsula, Danco Coast on the west side of Antarctic Peninsula